BAP Almirante Grau is the third out of four Carvajal-class frigates ordered by the Peruvian Navy in 1973 and originally named Montero. It was built by SIMA (Servicio Industrial de la Marina) at Callao under license from the Italian shipbuilder Cantieri Navali Riuniti. As such, it was the first modern warship built in Peru. In late 2007 her flight deck was extended to allow ASH-3D Sea King helicopters to land and refuel, even though they can not be housed in the ship's hangar.

On 26 September 2017 the ship was renamed BAP Almirante Grau on designation as the Peruvian fleet's flagship.

As Montero, she ship was named after Rear Admiral Lizardo Montero Flores (1832–1905) who fought in the War of the Pacific, and now honours Admiral Miguel Grau Seminario (1834-1879), hero of the Naval Battle of Angamos.

International exercises

 RIMPAC (Hawaii-USA) 2002.
 SIFOREX (Peru) 2001, 2003, 2004, 2007.
 UNITAS
Phase-0 (Puerto Rico) 1993, 1997.
Phase-4 (Peru) 1984, 1985, 1987, 1988, 1989, 1990, 1991, 1995, 1996, 1999, 2000.
Atlantic Phase 2003 (Argentina).
Pacific Phase 2004 (Peru), 2006 (Chile), 2007 (Peru).

Gallery

References

Sources
 Rodríguez, John, "Las fragatas Lupo: una breve mirada retrospectiva y perspectivas". Revista de Marina, Year 95, No. 3: 8-32 (July / December 2002)

External links
Navy Newsstand RIMPAC -  A direct hit by BAP Montero caused the final blow and eventually sank the "hostile" vessel (ex-USS Rathburne)

1982 ships
Carvajal-class frigates
Ships built in Peru